Giovanni Lorenzo Berti (1696–1766), also known by his Latinized name Johannes Laurentius Berti, was an Italian Augustinian theologian. The General of the Order of Hermits of St. Augustine, Schiaffinati, instructed him to write a book, to be used by all the students of the Order, expounding the whole of Augustine of Hippo's thought and particularly his doctrine of grace and free will. His huge Opus de Theologicis Disciplinis expounded not the private views of a theologian, but those of the Augustinian Order and therefore had a semi-official status in the Roman Catholic Church.

He was denounced to the Holy Office as a Jansenist by two French bishops. In December 1750, Pope Benedict XIV wrote a letter to one of them saying that the work had been submitted to competent theologians who had judged it to be sound; to the other he wrote a letter in May 1751 saying that nothing had been found in his work contrary to any decision of the Church.

References

External links
 Winfried BOCXE, O. E. S. A.: Introduction to the Teaching of the Italian Augustinians of the 18th Century on the Nature of Actual Grace
 Catholic Encyclopedia Article
 

1696 births
1766 deaths
Augustinian friars
18th-century Italian Roman Catholic theologians